Hello Goodbye is a Scandinavian indie-rock band. Band members include Swedes Lisa Lundvist and Johannes Kanschat, along with Norwegians Frode Fivel and Alex Kloster-Jensen, who also is the band's producer.

Members

Lisa Lundvist - Vocals
Johannes Kanschat - Drummer
Frode Fivel - Guitarist/Vocals
Alex Kloster-Jensen - Guitarist/Producer

Discography

African Nights 7", Smalltown Supersound (1999)
Cheesecake, Last Take 7", Booff Records (2002)
Heart Attack CD/LP, Racing Junior (2002)
Haunted Holiday CD, Racing Junior (2004)

References

 Hello Goodbye biography

External links
Official Website

Swedish musical groups
Norwegian musical groups